Coyanosa Draw is a river in Pecos County and Reeves County Texas, with part of it running adjacent to Coyanosa. It is 28 miles north west of Fort Stockton. The draw splits off from the Pecos River. While the draw was at one point visible running surface water, most of the draw is now groundwater. The river was named in Echo Burning, a Jack Reacher novel by Lee Child.

See also
List of rivers of Texas

References

USGS Geographic Names Information Service
USGS Hydrologic Unit Map - State of Texas (1974)

Rivers of Texas